Derakhtak (also Romanized as Darakhtak) is a village in Varzaq Rural District, in the Central District of Faridan County, Isfahan Province, Iran. At the 2006 census, its population was 392, in 92 families.

References 

Populated places in Faridan County